The 2022–23 Metro Atlantic Athletic Conference (MAAC) men's basketball season begins with practices in October 2022, followed by the start of the 2022–23 NCAA Division I men's basketball season in November. Conference play will start in December and conclude in March 2023. This will be the 42nd season of MAAC basketball.

The 2023 MAAC tournament will be played March 7–11, 2023 at the Jim Whelan Boardwalk Hall in Atlantic City, New Jersey for the fourth year in a row.

This will be the first season in the MAAC for Mount St. Mary's. On May 2, 2022, it was announced that the Mountaineers would leave the Northeast Conference and join the MAAC on July 1, 2022. They replace Monmouth, which left the MAAC after last season and joined the Colonial Athletic Association on July 1, 2022.

Head Coaches

Coaching changes 

On March 30, 2022, head coach and Seton Hall alum Shaheen Holloway of Saint Peter's left to take the head coaching position at his alma mater, where he previously was an assistant from 2010 through 2018. Former Wagner head coach Bashir Mason was hired as Saint Peter's 16th men's head basketball coach on April 12, 2022.
On October 25, 2022, less than two weeks before the start of the Manhattan Jaspers' season, head coach Steve Masiello was fired. Associate head coach and former player RaShawn Stores was named interim head coach.

Coaches 

Notes: 
 All records, appearances, titles, etc. are from time with current school only. 
 Year at school includes 2022–23 season.
 Overall and MAAC/NCAA records are from time at current school and are before the beginning of the 2022–23 season.
 Previous jobs are head coaching jobs unless otherwise noted.

Preseason

Preseason Coaches Poll

( ) first place votes

Preseason All-MAAC teams

† denotes unanimous selection

Preseason Player of the Year

MAAC Regular Season

Conference matrix
This table summarizes the final head-to-head results between teams in conference play during the 2022–23 season.

Player of the week
Throughout the regular season, the Metro Atlantic Athletic Conference offices named player(s) of the week and rookie(s) of the week.

Records against other conferences
Records against non-conference foes for the 2022–23 season. Records shown for regular season only.

Postseason

MAAC Tournament

 2023 Metro Atlantic Athletic Conference Basketball Tournament, Jim Whelan Boardwalk Hall, Atlantic City, New Jersey

Honors and awards

MAAC Season Awards

All-MAAC tournament team

2022–23 Season statistic leaders

Individual statistic NCAA Top 100 leaders

Team statistic rankings

References

External links
MAAC website